La disubbidienza (Disobedience) is a 1981 Italian drama film directed by Aldo Lado. It is based on the novel with the same name written by Alberto Moravia.

Plot
The adventures of Luca Manzi, a teenager living in Northern Italy during wartime.

Cast
 Stefania Sandrelli: Angela
 Teresa Ann Savoy: Edith
 Mario Adorf: Mr. Manzi 
 Marie-José Nat: Miss Manzi 
 Karl Zinny: Luca Manzi
 Jacques Perrin: Dario
 Marc Porel: Alfio
 Nanni Loy: Professor 
 Clara Colosimo

References

External links

1981 films
Italian drama films
1981 drama films
Films scored by Ennio Morricone
Films directed by Aldo Lado
Films based on Italian novels
Films based on works by Alberto Moravia
1980s Italian-language films
1980s Italian films